Sport Lubango e Benfica, and best known as Benfica do Lubango, is an Angolan football club based in Lubango. They play their home games at the Estádio Nossa Senhora do Monte.

Benfica do Lubango was established as the 16th affiliate of Sport Lisboa e Benfica. The first chairman to be elected was Eduardo Gomes de Albuquerque e Castro.

Following the country's independence in 1975 and an attempt by the communist regime to erase all traces of colonial rule (even from sports), the club, which had been created as an affiliate to S.L. Benfica, was ordered to change its name and therefore became known as Desportivo da Chela, as it participated in the first edition of the country's post-independence premier league.

League & Cup Positions

Manager history and performance

Players

2001-2019

1979-1986

See also
 Girabola
 Gira Angola

References

Guy Oliver. Almanack of World Football 2007 Headline, 2006 pg. 171

External links
 2014 Girabola squad at Girabola.com

Football clubs in Angola
Sports clubs in Angola
Lubango
Association football clubs established in 1932
1932 establishments in Angola
Lubango